
Gmina Pilzno is an urban-rural gmina (administrative district) in Dębica County, Subcarpathian Voivodeship, in south-eastern Poland.

Villages
Apart from the town of Pilzno, Gmina Pilzno contains the villages and settlements of Bielowy, Dobrków, Gębiczyna, Gołęczyna, Jaworze Dolne, Jaworze Górne, Łęki Dolne, Łęki Górne, Lipiny, Machowa, Mokrzec, Parkosz, Podlesie, Połomia, Słotowa, Strzegocice and Zwiernik.

Neighbouring gminas
Gmina Pilzno is bordered by the town of Dębica and by the gminas of Brzostek, Czarna, Dębica, Jodłowa, Ryglice and Skrzyszów.

References
Polish official population figures 2006

Pilzno
Dębica County